Jason Jefferson (born December 20, 1981) is a former American football defensive tackle. He was drafted by the New Orleans Saints in the sixth round of the 2005 NFL Draft. He played college football at Wisconsin.

Jefferson was also a member of the Chicago Bears, Philadelphia Eagles, Buffalo Bills and Atlanta Falcons.

Education
Jason Jefferson is a graduate of Leo Catholic High School, located on the South Side of Chicago.

References

External links
Atlanta Falcons bio

1981 births
Living people
Players of American football from Chicago
American football defensive tackles
Wisconsin Badgers football players
New Orleans Saints players
Chicago Bears players
Philadelphia Eagles players
Buffalo Bills players
Atlanta Falcons players